Maxillary sinus floor augmentation (also termed sinus lift, sinus graft, sinus augmentation or sinus procedure) is a surgical procedure which aims to increase the amount of bone in the posterior maxilla (upper jaw bone), in the area of the premolar and molar teeth, by lifting the lower Schneiderian membrane (sinus membrane) and placing a bone graft.

When a tooth is lost, the alveolar process begins to remodel. The vacant tooth socket collapses as it heals leaving an edentulous (toothless) area, termed a ridge. This collapse causes a loss in both height and width of the surrounding bone. In addition, when a maxillary molar or premolar is lost, the maxillary sinus pneumatizes in this region which further diminishes the thickness of the underlying bone. Overall, this leads to a loss in volume of bone that is available for implantation of dental implants, which rely on osseointegration (bone integration), to replace missing teeth. The goal of the sinus lift is to graft extra bone into the maxillary sinus, so more bone is available to support a dental implant.

Indications

While there may be a number of reasons for wanting a greater volume of bone in the posterior maxilla, the most common reason in contemporary dental treatment planning is to prepare the site for the future placement of dental implants.

Sinus augmentation (sinus lift) is performed when the floor of the sinus is too close to an area where dental implants are to be placed. This procedure is performed to ensure a secure place for the implants while protecting the sinus. Lowering of the sinus can be caused by: Long-term tooth loss without the required treatment, periodontal disease, trauma.

Patients who have the following may be good candidates for sinus augmentation.

 Lost more than one tooth in the posterior maxilla.
 Lost a significant amount of bone in the posterior maxilla.
 Missing teeth due to genetics or birth defect.
 Minus most of the maxillary teeth and need a strong sinus floor for multiple implants.
It is not known if using sinus lift techniques is more successful than using short implants for reducing the number of artificial teeth or dental implant failures up to a year after teeth/implant placement.

Technique

Prior to undergoing sinus augmentation, diagnostics are run to determine the health of the patient's sinuses. Panoramic radiographs are taken to map out the patient's upper jaw and sinuses. In special instances, Cone beam computed tomography is preferable to measure the sinus's height and width, and to rule out any sinus disease or pathology.

There are several variations of the sinus lift technique.

Traditional Sinus Augmentation or Lateral Window Technique 
There are multiple ways to perform sinus augmentation.  The procedure is performed from inside the patient's mouth where the surgeon makes an incision into the gum, or gingiva.  Once the incision is made, the surgeon then pulls back the gum tissue, exposing the lateral boney wall of the sinus. The surgeon then cuts a "window" to the sinus, which is exposing the Schneiderian membrane. The membrane is separated from the bone, and bone graft material is placed into the newly created space. The gums are then sutured close and the graft is left to heal for 4–12 months.

The graft material used can be either an autograft, an allograft, a xenograft, an alloplast (a growth-factor infused collagen matrix), synthetic variants, or combinations thereof. Studies indicate that the mere lifting of the sinus membrane, creation of a void space and blood clot formation might result in new bone owing to the principles of guided bone regeneration. The long-term prognosis for the technique is estimated to 94%.

Osteotome Technique 
As an alternative, sinus augmentation can be performed by a less invasive osteotome technique. There are several variations of this technique and all originate from the original technique of Dr. Tatum, first published by Dr.s Boyne and James in 1980.

Dr. Robert B. Summers described a technique that is normally performed when the sinus floor that needs to be lifted is less than 4 mm. This technique is performed by flapping back gum tissue and making a socket in the bone within 1–2 mm short of the sinus membrane. The floor of the sinus is then lifted by tapping the sinus floor with the use of osteotomes. The amount of augmentation achieved with the osteotome technique is usually less than what can be achieved with the lateral window technique.
A dental implant is normally placed in the socket formed at the time of the sinus lift procedure and left to integrate with bone. Bone integration normally lasts 4 to 8 months. The goal of this procedure is to stimulate bone growth and form a thicker sinus floor, in order to support dental implants for teeth replacement.
Sinus dimensions and shape significantly influence new bone formation after transcrestal sinus floor elevation: with this technique, the regeneration of a substantial amount of new bone is a predictable outcome only in narrow sinus cavities. During presurgical planning, bucco- palatal sinus width should be regarded as a crucial parameter when choosing sinus floor elevation with transcrestal approach as a treatment option.

Dr. Bruschi and Scipioni described a similar technique (Localized Management of Sinus Floor or L.M.S.F.) that is based on a partial thickness flap procedure. This technique increases the malleability of the crestal bone and uses not the bone directly below the sinus, but rather the bone on the medial wall, and thus can be used in more extreme cases of bone resorption that would normally need to be treated with the lateral wall technique. The healing period is reduced to 1.5 to 3 months. Recently an electrical mallet has been introduced to simplify the application of this and similar techniques.

Complications

A major risk of a sinus augmentation is that the sinus membrane could be pierced or ripped.  Remedies, should this occur, include stitching the tear or placing a patch over it; in some cases, the surgery is stopped altogether and the tear is given time to heal, usually three to six months. Often, the sinus membrane grows back thicker and stronger, making success more likely on the second operation. Although rarely reported, such secondary intervention can also be successful when the primary surgery is limited to elevation of the membrane without the insertion of additional material.

Besides tearing of the sinus membrane, there are other risks involved in sinus augmentation surgery. Most notably, the close relationship of the augmentation site with the sinonasal complex can induce sinusitis, which may chronicize and cause severe symptoms. Sinusitis resulting from maxillary sinus augmentation is considered a Class 1 sinonasal complication according to Felisati classification and should be addressed surgically with a combined endoscopic endonasal and endoral approach. Beside sinusitis, among other procedure related-risks include:
infection,
inflammation,
pain,
itching,
allergic reaction,
tissue or nerve damage,
scar formation,
hematoma,
graft failure,
oro-antral communication / oro-antral fistula,
tilting or loosening of implants, or
bleeding,

Recovery

It takes about three to six months for the sinus augmentation bone to become part of the patient's natural sinus floor bone. Up to six months of healing is sometimes left before implants are attempted. However, some surgeons perform both the augmentation and dental implant simultaneously, to avoid the necessity of two surgeries.

History

The first maxillary sinus floor augmentation procedure was performed by Oscar Hilt Tatum, Jr. in 1974.

A sinus-lift procedure was first performed by Dr. Hilt Tatum Jr. in 1974 during his period of preparation to begin sinus grafting. The first sinus graft was done by Tatum in February, 1975 in Lee County Hospital in Opelika, Alabama. This was followed by the placement and successful restoration of two endosteal implants. Between 1975 and 1979, much of the sinus lining elevation was done using inflatable catheters. After this, suitable instruments had been developed to manage the lining elevation from the different anatomical surfaces encountered in sinuses. Tatum first presented the concept at The Alabama Implant Congress in Birmingham, Alabama in 1976 and presented the evolution of technique during multiple podium presentations each year until 1986 when he published an article describing the procedure. Dr. Philip Boyne was introduced to the procedure when he was invited, by Tatum, to be "The Discusser" of a presentation on sinus grafting given by Tatum at the annual meeting of The American Academy of Implant Dentistry in 1977 or 1978. Boyne and James authored the first publication on the technique in 1980 when they published case reports of autogenous grafts placed into the sinus and allowed to heal for 6 months, which was followed by the placement of blade implants. This sequence was confirmed by Boyne before the attendees at The Alabama Implant Congress in 1994.

Cost-effectiveness
The slightly higher effectiveness (implant survival) of the lateral sinus lift technique needs to be considered in relation to the substantially higher costs in comparison with the transalveolar sinus lift technique. From a patient perspective the higher invasiveness of the lateral technique will also be an important decision criterion. However, the transalveolar approach is unlikely to be effective in cases of advanced levels of bone reduction at the implant site.

References

 

 
 
 Lazzara RJ. The sinus elevation procedure in endosseous implant therapy. Curr Opin Periodontol 1996; 3:178-183.
 Summers RB. A new concept in maxillary implant surgery: The osteotome technique. Compendium 1994;15:152, 154–156, 158 passim; quiz 162.
 Summers RB. The osteotome technique: Part 3 – Less invasive methods of elevating the sinus floor. Compendium 1994;15:698, 700, 702-694 passim; quiz 710.

External links
Educational Resources
OsseoNews.com A detailed discussion on sinus lift procedures.
Sonosurgery.it  Documented cases on sinus lift procedures with sonical instruments.

Dentistry procedures
Sinus surgery
Periodontology